Ablah is a village in northern Aleppo Governorate, northwestern Syria.

Administratively the village belongs to Nahiya Akhtarin in Azaz District. Nearby localities include Tall Tanah  to the northwest and Hezwan  to the southeast. In the 2004 census, Ablah had a population of 517.

References

Aleppo Governorate